Renhe station may refer to:

 Renhe station (Chongqing Rail Transit), a station on the Chongqing Rail Transit in Chongqing
 Renhe station (Guangzhou Metro), a station on the Guangzhou Metro in Guangzhou, Guangdong
 Renhe station (Hangzhou Metro), a station on the Hangzhou Metro in Hangzhou, Zhejiang